The Missouri-Pacific Depot, Altus is a historic railroad station on United States Route 64 in Altus, Arkansas.  It is a long rectangular single-story wood-frame structure, finished in stucco, with a gable-on-hip roof with broad eaves.  It was built in 1920 by the Missouri-Pacific Railroad, and served as both a passenger and freight depot.  It is representative of the town's early history as a railroad town.

The building was listed on the National Register of Historic Places in 1992.

See also
National Register of Historic Places listings in Franklin County, Arkansas

References

Railway stations on the National Register of Historic Places in Arkansas
Railway stations in the United States opened in 1920
National Register of Historic Places in Franklin County, Arkansas
Altus
Former railway stations in Arkansas